Stanley E. Bogdan (December 16, 1918 – March 27, 2011) was the founder of S.E. Custom Built, a company dedicated to the handmade construction of fly reels.

Biography 
Bogdan was born in Nashua, NH, and lived there throughout his entire life.  He became interested in fly fishing at an early age when he began receiving outdated copies of a hunting and fishing magazine from a local sports retailer.  At age 13, Bogdan was tying his own flies and would then become immersed in the sport.  Upon graduating high school, Bogdan began work at Rollins Engine Company, a local engines manufacturer in Nashua.  Later on, while working as a machinist, he began constructing some of the first prototypes for his reels. Once, while standing on the shore of one of his favorite rivers, The Grand Cascapedia, Bogdan smiled and said: "I'd die if I could not fish anymore".  He had two children, Cheryl Doughty and Stephen (d. August 15, 2021), with his wife, Phyllis (d. 1995). Stanley Bogdan died on March 27, 2011.

S.E. Custom Built
S.E. Custom Built fly reels are primarily known for their ability to greatly reduce drag.  This is mostly attributed to Bogdan's concept of the double-break shoe, known as the hallmark of any Bogdan reel. The company is mostly focused on the production of salmon reels, but they have also made a few trout reel models.

Company History
Bogdan sold his first set of reels in 1955.  At the New England Sportsmen's Show, he received $150 from Julian Crandall for a set of 10 reels (one of which Crandall gave to professional baseball player, Ted Williams).  That same year Bogdan would make a deal with Abercrombie & Fitch, one of the day's leading marketers of sport's goods, for a set of 40 reels. The deal provided that:
Three different models were to be made: 100M, 200M, 300M
An identification code was to be stamped on each reel foot
Anodized gloss black for the reel feet and handles to be used instead of the aluminum serpentine
The reels would sell at $100 retail price granting Bogdan 60% of all sales

At this time, Bogdan would retire work at the factories and begin working entirely on his reel making company.  From 1957 to 1977, S.E. Custom Built would have a relationship with Orvis including a deal similar to the one with Abercrombie & Fitch.  The Orvis reels differed slightly because they decided to use Bogdan's original aluminum serpentine colors.  Bogdan reels have since been marketed by many of the industry's major tackle merchants.  Eventually demands came for a trout reel in the Bogdan style, so S.E. Custom Built released a 5-weight single-action, non-adjustable, pawl-drag reel in 1976.  Demands would come for similar 3-, 4-, and 6-weight reels as well.

Stephen Bogdan, Stanley's son, would join S.E. Custom Built in September 1973.  Stephen purchased the company and became the sole owner in 1996.

Reels
Two qualities of Bogdan reels that they are most known for are Bogdan's signature double-brake shoe and the 10 position lever provided that is used to regulate drag.  They also have black anodized side plates with a pale gold anodized frame.  The prices of a Bogdan reel range from $1,500 to $2,400, depending on the type of fish one plans to catch with it.  Each Bogdan reel was handcrafted by either Stanley or Stephen.  Avid reel collector and friend of Bogdan's, Douglas Marchant says, "Since each reel is the product of very intensive hand labor, forecasting delivery is virtually impossible."

Bogdan's reels are owned and praised by some notable figures in fly fishing, such as:
John Olin
Lee Wulff
Julian Crandall
Ted Bates
R.L. Haig Brown
 Sergey Shakirtov
 Paul Lucas

References

Keller, Mitch, "Stanley Bogdan, Maker of Much-Coveted Fly Reels, is Dead at 92", "New York Times", April 2001
Hilyard, Graydon R., "Bogdan", Frank Amato Publications Portland, Oregon, 2006
Marchant, Douglas, "The Bogdan Story", "West Slope"

1918 births
2011 deaths
People from Nashua, New Hampshire
American businesspeople